Peter Sam Shivute (born 25 September 1963) is a Namibian judge who is currently serving as the Chief Justice of the Supreme Court of Namibia since 1 December 2004. He is the first black Namibian to be appointed to this position.

Early life and education
Shivute was born in Ovamboland in South West Africa (Present day Namibia). At the age of 16 he went into exile, continuing his secondary school education in Zambia.

While still in Zambia, he received a Diploma in Legal Studies with distinction in 1986. He left Zambia for the United Kingdom where he obtained an LLB (Honors) from Trinity Hall College, University of Cambridge in 1991. After working in now independent Namibia for four years he returned to the UK to complete the LLM from University of Warwick in 1996. Shivute further holds a Diploma in Development Studies and Management.

Legal career
Peter Shivute was appointed magistrate in the Judicial Service of the Republic of Zambia in 1987, barely 24 years old. On his return from exile he served as magistrate in the Namibian Judiciary from 1991 to 2000, as Judge, later Judge President, of the High Court.

On 1 December 2004, Shivute was appointed Chief Justice of Namibia, the highest judge that heads the Supreme Court. He is the fourth Namibian Chief Justice, succeeding Johan Strydom who retired in 2003. He further is the chairman of the Judicial Service Commission and the Board of Legal Education. In 2002, he chaired the Third Delimitation Commission of Namibia, a body that infrequently decides on the administrative division of the country.

Shivute frequently publishes on politics, human rights, and the law in Namibia. He is married to judge Naomi Shivute.

References

1963 births
Living people
Chief justices of Namibia
Alumni of the University of Warwick
Ovambo people
Alumni of Trinity Hall, Cambridge
20th-century Namibian lawyers